The 1916 United States Senate election in Missouri was held on November 7, 1916. Incumbent Democratic U.S. Senator James A. Reed was re-elected to a second term over Republican R. R. Brewster.

Democratic primary

Candidates
Lawrence A. Martin
James A. Reed, incumbent Senator since 1911

Results

Republican primary

Candidates
Thomas J. Akins, nominee for U.S. Senate in 1914
Walter S. Dickey, businessman and former chairman of the Missouri Republican Party
Nathan Frank, former U.S. Representative from St. Louis

Results

General election

Results

See also
1916 United States Senate elections
List of United States senators from Missouri

References

1916
Missouri
United States Senate